Bredon's Norton or Norton-by-Bredon is a village and civil parish  south east of Worcester, in the Wychavon district, in the county of Worcestershire, England. In 2011 the parish had a population of 247. The parish touches Eckington, Bredon, Strensham and Kemerton.

Features 
There are 21 listed buildings in Bredon's Norton. St Giles's Church was rebuilt in 1883.

History 
The name "Bredons Norton" means 'Bredon's north farm/settlement'. Bredons Norton was recorded in the Domesday Book as Nortune. Bredon's Norton was "Nortune" in the 11th century and "Northton" in the 13th century. In the early 12th century Bredons Norton Manor was held by the Bishop of Worcester. Bredons Norton became a civil parish in 1866.

Notable residents
 Antarctic explorer Raymond Priestley was born in nearby Tewkesbury and retired to Bredon's Norton. Pieces relating to his life are in Tewkesbury Borough Museum.
 American women's rights activist Victoria Woodhull retired and died in Bredon's Norton.

References

External links 
 Village website

Villages in Worcestershire
Civil parishes in Worcestershire
Wychavon